Supercopa de España is the third most relevant Spanish rugby's tournament.

It's played to a single match between the League's champion and the Copa del Rey's winner. If a same team wins League & Cup, the Supercopa will be played between the League's champion and the Copa's runners-up.

Supercopa was established in 2003, being played the match usually in August or September.

Winners by year

Titles by team

See also 
División de Honor de Rugby
Copa del Rey de Rugby
Rugby union in Spain

References

External links 
Federación Española de Rugby

Rugby union competitions in Spain
2003 establishments in Spain